Stuttgart 2 is an electoral constituency (German: Wahlkreis) represented in the Bundestag. It elects one member via first-past-the-post voting. Under the current constituency numbering system, it is designated as constituency 259. It is located in central Baden-Württemberg, comprising the northern part of the city of Stuttgart.

Stuttgart II was created for the inaugural 1949 federal election. Since 2021, it has been represented by Maximilian Mörseburg of the Christian Democratic Union (CDU).

Geography
Stuttgart II is located in central Baden-Württemberg. As of the 2021 federal election, it comprises the Stadtbezirke of Bad Cannstatt, Botnang, Feuerbach, Mühlhausen, Münster, Obertürkheim, Stammheim, Stuttgart-Ost, Untertürkheim, Wangen, Weilimdorf, and Zuffenhausen from the independent city of Stuttgart.

History
Stuttgart II was created in 1949. In the 1980 through 1998 elections, it was named Stuttgart-Nord. In the 1949 election, it was Württemberg-Baden Landesbezirk Württemberg constituency 2 in the numbering system. In the 1953 through 1961 elections, it was number 164. In the 1965 through 1976 elections, it was number 165. In the 1980 through 1998 elections, it was number 163. In the 2002 and 2005 elections, it was number 260. Since the 2009 election, it has been number 259.

Originally, the constituency comprised the Stadtteile of Stuttgart-Ost, Stuttgart-Nord, Bad Cannstatt, Stammheim, Zuffenhausen, Mühlhausen, Hofen, Münster, Untertürkheim, Rotenberg, Uhlbach, Wangen, Obertürkheim, Rohracker, Hedelfingen, Sillenbuch, Heumaden, and Riedenberg from the independent city of Stuttgart. In the 1965 through 1976 elections, it comprised the Stadtteile of Stuttgart-Mitte, Stuttgart-Ost, Stuttgart-Nord, Birkach, Hedelfingen, Untertürkheim, Obertürkheim, Plieningen, Sillenbuch, and Wangen. It acquired its current borders in the 1980 election.

Members
The constituency was first represented by Erwin Schoettle of the Social Democratic Party (SPD) from 1949 to 1953. 	Erwin Häussler won it for the Christian Democratic Union (CDU) in 1953 and served two terms before former member Schoettle regained it in 1961. He was succeeded by fellow SPD member Ernst Haar from 1965 to 1980, followed by Peter Conradi from 1980 to 1983. Herbert Czaja of the CDU was elected in 1983 and served until 1990. Erika Reinhardt of the CDU served two terms before Ute Kumpf of the SPD won the constituency in 1998. She was representative until 2009. Karin Maag served until 2021. She was succeeded by fellow CDU member Maximilian Mörseburg.

Election results

2021 election

2017 election

2013 election

2009 election

References

Federal electoral districts in Baden-Württemberg
1949 establishments in West Germany
Constituencies established in 1949
Stuttgart